Zardak may refer to:
 Zardak, Kohgiluyeh and Boyer-Ahmad
 Zardak, Kurdistan
 Zardak, Razavi Khorasan